The athletics at the 1997 Summer Universiade took place in the Stadio Cibali in Catania, Sicily (Italy) at the end of August 1997, shortly after the World Championships in Athens, Greece. New events were the women's hammer throw, pole vault and half marathon competition. The marathon was dropped from the programme in favour of the half distance. A total of 23 men's and 22 women's events were contested (the difference being that steeplechase was held for men only).

The United States topped the athletics medal table (as it had in 1995) with a total of 21 medals, eight of them gold. Russia was the next most successful nation, with six golds among its haul of 16 medals. Ukraine won five gold medals, while Cuba won four events and had the third highest medal total at twelve. The host nation, Italy, won eight medals. A total of 34 nations reached the medal table.

Among the 1995 men's champions, Ukrainian shot putter Yuriy Bilonoh and hammer thrower Balázs Kiss of Hungary successfully defended their titles. On the women's side, double distance champion Gabriela Szabo won the 1500 metres again and Russia's Natalya Sadova  repeated as discus throw winner. Student-athletes Szabo, Iván Pedroso (long jump) Yoelbi Quesada (triple jump) and Marius Corbett (javelin) won both Universiade and World Championships gold medals that year, though there was an upset in the Universiade racewalking events, as world champion and world leader Annarita Sidoti only managed third place.

Medal summary

Men

Women

Medal table

References
World Student Games (Universiade - Men) - GBR Athletics
World Student Games (Universiade - Women) - GBR Athletics
 Results on HickokSports

External links
 FISU

 
1997
Universiade
1997 Summer Universiade
1997 Universiade